MihTy (also written Mih-Ty) is the eponymous debut studio album by American duo MihTy, composed of Jeremih and Ty Dolla Sign. It was released on October 26, 2018, through Def Jam Recordings and Atlantic Records.

Background
Ty Dolla Sign and Jeremih had previously collaborated on several songs before MihTy. Work on the album was reportedly completed in December 2017. Ty Dolla Sign stated that over 60 songs were made for the album, recorded over eight sessions. Dolla Sign stated before the project's release that it was a "consistent album of bangers."

The album was delayed, with a release date of August 24 planned and was eventually released on October 26, 2018. The tracklist was revealed on October 23, 2018.

Promotion
The lead single for the album, titled "The Light," was released on June 8, 2018. The song was described by Billboard as "a summer-ready banger" with 90's R&B samples. A music video, taking place in a skate park, was released the following month. It was later certified Gold by the RIAA in 2020. This song was followed by the second single, "Goin Thru Some Thangz" on October 12, 2018. The two also performed on Jimmy Kimmel Live!. A promotional single, "New Level" featuring Lil Wayne, was released for free on SoundCloud the day of the originally planned album release date.

Critical reception

Writing for Pitchfork, Austin Brown said that "Jeremih and Ty Dolla $ign are unquestionably the natural successors to the figure of the 'R&B thug' that defined the R&B charts for most of the aughts" and felt that with MihTy, they have collaborated with producer Hitmaka to make a "project so buttery smooth that you might not realize how much it's at war with itself". Brown said that Hitmaka and the rest of the producers "bring neon synth pads and a dash of vaguely Balearic electronic sparkle to the proceedings, eschewing deference in favor of, oddly enough, a chillwave-y evocation of 1990s R&B", which gives the singers a "woozy, classicist gilded cage in which [they are] set loose to ping-pong off each other". Trevor Smith of HotNewHipHop called the record "a rare joint album that is more than the sum of its parts", judging that "Ty and Jeremih's extensive collaborative experience and willingness to come together as a proper songwriting team is really what takes it home."

Track listing
Credits adapted from Tidal.

Notes
  signifies a co-producer
 "The Light" features background vocals by Gabrielle Nowee

Personnel
Credits adapted from Tidal.

Technical
 Sauce Miyagi – recording 
 Jaycen Joshua – mixing 
 Jacob Richards – mixing assistant 
 Rashawn McLean – mixing assistant 
 Mike Seaberg – mixing assistant 

Artwork
 McFlyy, LLC.

Charts

References

2018 debut albums
Jeremih albums
Ty Dolla Sign albums
Def Jam Recordings albums
Atlantic Records albums
Albums produced by Cubeatz
Albums produced by Hitmaka
Collaborative albums